Sherwin P. Cijntje (born March 2, 1964) is a Curaçaoan former professional baseball outfielder who played for the Netherlands Antilles national baseball team, professionally in the minor leagues and in the Hoofdklasse.

Cijntje did not play baseball or even see baseball played in person until he was 15 years old and "a man" came to his town of about 80 people and began teaching the sport.

He played for the Netherlands Antilles in the 1982 Central American and Caribbean Games. The team had a 3-3 record in the tournament and didn't win a medal. He played professionally from 1983 to 1989 in the Baltimore Orioles (1983–1989) and Cleveland Indians (1989) systems. He hit as high as .303 and once stole as many as 51 bases in a season (1986, with the Hagerstown Suns). Overall, he hit .270 with 588 hits and 184 stolen bases in 642 games.

He was the first Curaçao native to play professional baseball in the United States. In September 1987, he was added to Baltimore's 40-man roster and became the first player from the Netherlands Antilles to be added to a Major League roster.

References

1964 births
Living people
Competitors at the 1982 Central American and Caribbean Games
Curaçao expatriate baseball players in the United States
Bluefield Orioles players
Canton-Akron Indians players
Charlotte Knights players
Charlotte O's players
Hagerstown Suns players
Newark Orioles players
Rochester Red Wings players